Wolf Lake is an American horror television series.

Wolf Lake may also refer to:

Places

Lakes
Wolf Lake (Alberta), Alberta
Wolf Lake (Yukon), northwestern Canada
Wolf Lake (Indiana–Illinois), Hammond, Indiana and Chicago, Illinois
Wolf Lake (Union), Union County, Illinois
Wolf Lake (Indiana), Noble County, Indiana
Wolf Lake (Michigan), Watersmeet Township, Michigan
Wolf Lake (Becker County, Minnesota)
Wolf Lake (Cottonwood County, Minnesota)
Wolf Lake (New York), Sullivan County, New York
Wolf Lake (Adams), Adams County, Wisconsin
Wolf Lake (Woodboro), Woodboro, Wisconsin
Wolf Lake (Ontario), Sudbury, Ontario
Wolfe Lake (Ontario), Westport, Ontario

Municipalities
Wolf Lake, Illinois, an unincorporated community in Union County
Wolf Lake, Indiana, an unincorporated community in Noble County
Wolf Lake, Michigan, a census-designated place
Wolf Lake, Minnesota, a village

Other uses
Wolf Lake (film), a 1978 film
Wolf Lake Speedway, a racing venue in Hammond, Indiana